Adeel Malik (born 17 October 1985) is a Pakistani cricketer. Born in Sialkot, Pakistan, Malik bowls right-arm leg break and bats right handed. He recently represented Essex in the 2015 season and has previously represented Sialkot Stallions and Pakistan International Airlines.

External links
 Adeel Malik at ESPN Cricinfo

1985 births
Living people
Essex cricketers
Pakistani cricketers
Cricketers from Sialkot